Richard Oliver Allen Marcus Lyne (21 December 1944 – 17 March 2005), also known as R.O.A.M. Lyne, was a British academic and classicist specialising in Latin poetry. He was a tutor in classics at Balliol College and Professor of Classical Languages and Literature at the University of Oxford.

Early life
Lyne was born on 21 December 1944 in Peterborough, Northamptonshire, England, to Richard and Rosalind Lyne.  He was educated at Highgate School, then an all-boys private school in London, where his father was a teacher of Latin.  He studied classics at St John's College, Cambridge. His tutor was Guy Lee. In 1966, he graduated with a first class Bachelor of Arts (BA) degree. He completed his Doctor of Philosophy (PhD) degree, also from the University of Cambridge, in 1970. His doctoral supervisor was F. R. D. Goodyear.

Academic career
While undertaking his doctorate, Lyne held two held short-term fellowships; at Fitzwilliam College, Cambridge and at Churchill College, Cambridge. In 1971, he moved to the University of Oxford where he became a Fellow of Balliol College. In 1999, he was appointed Professor of Classical Languages and Literature.

Death
On 17 March 2005, Lyne died at the age of 60 having suffered a cerebral haemorrhage while at his holiday home located in Marche, Italy.

An edited volume, R. O. A. M. Lyne: Collected Papers on Latin Poetry, was published in 2007 as a memorial to him; the introduction was written by Stephen Harrison.

Personal life
Lyne married Linda (née Rees) in 1969. He had met her when they were both students. Together they had two children; Raphael, born 1971, and Rosy, born 1973.

His older brother is Adrian Lyne, a film director.

Select works

References

1944 births
2005 deaths
Fellows of Balliol College, Oxford
People from Peterborough
People educated at Highgate School
Alumni of St John's College, Cambridge
Fellows of Fitzwilliam College, Cambridge
Fellows of Churchill College, Cambridge
English classical scholars
Scholars of Latin literature